This is a list of notable footballers who have played for Notts County. The aim is for this list to include all players that have played 100 or more senior matches for the club. Other players who are deemed to have played an important role for the club can be included, but the reason for their notability should be included in the 'Notes' column.

Players should be listed in chronological order according to the year in which they first played for the club, and then by alphabetical order of their surname. Appearances and goals should be for first-team competitive games and include substitute appearances, but exclude wartime matches.

List of players

Statistics are up to date as of 1 May 2010.

Please help to expand this list.

Note: the source for the Career dates and Total apps/goals for a number of the below players is unclear and the reference used should be added.

References

 Post-war Football League Player statistics
 Soccerbase stats (use Search for...on left menu and select 'Players' drop down)
 

Notts County F.C.
Association football player non-biographical articles
List
Players